Navjeet Kaur Dhillon (born 6 March 1995) is an Indian track and field athlete who competes as a Discus thrower. Her current world ranking in the Women's Discus Throw category is 46, and in the Women's Overall ranking is 4165. She was the bronze medalist at the 2018 Commonwealth Games, with her final throw of 57.43 m and became the second Indian to win a medal at the World Junior Championships in Athletics in 2014.

Dhillon had to wait for more than two years to receive her cash award for the World Junior Athletics Championship bronze medal. She hoped to receive a job offer by the Punjab government. She is presently employed in as an income tax inspector.

Following a doping violation in June 2022, she was banned for a period of three years.

Career
Born in Amritsar, Dhillon won the Indian junior title in the discus in 2010 and the national youth title in 2011. She made her international debut at the 2011 World Youth Championships in Athletics, competing in qualifying only, and won her first medal (a bronze) at the 2011 Commonwealth Youth Games. Dhillon won a shot put/discus double at the 2012 Indian Junior Championships and claimed a silver medal at the 2012 Asian Junior Athletics Championships behind Subenrat Insaeng.

Dhillon made her first appearance in the senior ranks in the 2013 season, competing in both shot put and discus at the 2013 Asian Athletics Championships. More age category medals came at the 2014 Asian Junior Athletics Championships, where she was third in the shot put and second in the discus. This made her the second Indian to win a medal at that competition, following in the footsteps of fellow women's discus thrower Seema Antil.

Dhillon topped the national podium in the discus in 2014 and 2015, as she transitioned into the senior ranks, as well as a shot put/discus double at the 2015 National Games of India. She was sixth in discus at the 2015 Asian Athletics Championships. She did not compete internationally in 2016 and 2017, though she won shot put national titles those years and was runner-up in the discus nationally. Dhillon won the discus bronze medal at the 2018 Commonwealth Games – her first senior international medal.

International competitions

National titles
India Open Athletics Championships
Discus throw: 2014, 2015
Shot put: 2016, 2017
National Games of India
Shot put: 2015
Discus throw: 2015

References

External links

1995 births
Living people
Athletes from Amritsar
Sportswomen from Punjab, India
Indian female discus throwers
Commonwealth Games bronze medallists for India
Commonwealth Games medallists in athletics
Athletes (track and field) at the 2018 Commonwealth Games
Athletes (track and field) at the 2022 Commonwealth Games
Medallists at the 2018 Commonwealth Games